Samuel Eichelbaum (14 November 1894 - 4 May 1967) was an Argentine writer. He was born the son of Russian-Jewish immigrants in Villa Domínguez, Entre Ríos, Argentina, Eichelbaum became one of the leading playwrights in the first half of the 20th century in Argentina. He was also a translator.

Works
La mala sed (The Bad Thirst, 1920)
El dogma (The Dogma, 1921)
Un hogar (A Home, 1922)
El judío Aarón (Aaron the Jew, 1926)
Cuando tengas un hijo (When You Have a Child, 1929)
Un guapo del 900 (The 1900s Dandy, 1940)
Pajaro de barro (Bird of Clay, 1940)
Divorcio nupcial (Nuptial Divorce, 1941)
Rostro perdido (Lost Face, 1952)
Dos brasas (Two Live Coals, 1952)
Subsuelo (Underground, 1966)

External links

Argentina's Jewish Short Story Writers, Rita M. Gardiol, 1986.

1894 births
1967 deaths
Jewish Argentine writers
Jewish dramatists and playwrights
People from Entre Ríos Province
Argentine dramatists and playwrights
Argentine translators
Argentine people of Russian-Jewish descent
Burials at La Chacarita Cemetery
20th-century Argentine writers
20th-century Argentine male writers
20th-century dramatists and playwrights
20th-century translators